Burry is a surname. Notable people with the surname include:

Andrew George Burry (1873–1975), businessman, manufacturer and philanthropist
Harold Burry (1912–1992), head football coach at Westminster College
Hugh Burry (1930–2013), New Zealand rugby union player
Lester Burry (1898–1977), United Church minister
Mark Burry (born 1957), New Zealand architect
Michael Burry, American investment fund manager

See also
Barry (disambiguation)
Berry (disambiguation)
Burri
Burry Holms
Burry Port
Bury (disambiguation)
The Burry Man